The seven deadly sins is a classification of vices used in Christian teachings.

Seven deadly sins may also refer to:

Art
 The Seven Deadly Sins and the Four Last Things, a 1485 painting by Hieronymus Bosch
 The Seven Deadly Sins of Modern Times, a 1993 painting by Susan Dorothea White

Books 
 Seven Deadly Sins, a 1992 book by William S. Burroughs
 Seven Deadly Sins (novel series), a 2005–2007 book series by Robin Wasserman
 Seven Deadly Sins, a 2010 book by vocalist Corey Taylor of the band Slipknot
 The Seven Deadly Sins (manga), a 2012 manga series
 Seven Deadly Sins: My Pursuit of Lance Armstrong, a 2012 book by journalist David Walsh
 The Seven Deadly Sins (play), a two-part play written c. 1585, attributed to Richard Tarlton

Film and television 
 The Magnificent Seven Deadly Sins, a 1971 comedy film
 Original Sin – The Seven Sins (2021 film)
 Les sept péchés capitaux, a 1992 Belgian sketch comedy film including a segment directed by Beatriz Flores Silva
 Seven Deadly Sins (miniseries), a 1993 Australian TV miniseries
 Seven Deadly Sins, a 2008–2009 History Channel series
 The Seven Deadly Sins (1952 film), a French/Italian film
 The Seven Deadly Sins (1962 film), a French film
 The Seven Deadly Sins (2014 TV series), anime television series based on a Japanese fantasy manga
 Seven Digital Deadly Sins, a 2014 web documentary
 Seven Mortal Sins, a media franchise by Hobby Japan, with a 2017 anime adaptation
 7 Deadly Sins (film) (2019), a horror film directed by Glenn Plummer, originally titled Charlie Charlie.

Toys 
 Seven Deadly Sins, a series of dolls in the Living Dead Dolls line

Music 
 The Seven Deadly Sins (ballet chanté), a 1933 ballet chanté by Kurt Weill,  Bertolt Brecht, and George Balanchine

Albums
 The Seven Deadly Sins (album), a 1998 album by Marianne Faithfull

Songs
 "7 Deadly Sins", a 1990 song by the Traveling Wilburys from the album Traveling Wilburys Vol. 3 
 "The Seven Deadly Sins", an Irish folk song on several albums by The Dubliners
 "The Seven Deadly Sins", a 2004 song by Flogging Molly from Within a Mile of Home
 The Seventh Deadly Sin, an album by Ice T
 "Seven Deadly Sins", a 2015 song by Man with a Mission, featured in the anime series with the same name
 "Seven Deadly Sins", a 2003 song by DJ Kay Slay from The Streetsweeper, Vol. 1

See also
 Deadly Sins (disambiguation)
 Seven sins (disambiguation)